Rui Domingues (born 15 April 1964) is a Portuguese judoka. He competed in the men's lightweight event at the 1992 Summer Olympics.

References

1964 births
Living people
Portuguese male judoka
Olympic judoka of Portugal
Judoka at the 1992 Summer Olympics
Place of birth missing (living people)